Vaathi is a 2023 Indian period action drama film written and directed by Venky Atluri. The film was shot simultaneously in Tamil and Telugu with the latter titled as Sir and produced by Tollywood studios Sithara Entertainments and Fortune Four Cinemas. The film features Dhanush and  Samyuktha in primary roles along with P. Sai Kumar, Tanikella Bharani, Samuthirakani and Hyper Aadi.

Plot 
The movie opens with many parents admitting their children into Thirupathi (Tamil)/Tripathi (Telugu) Educational Institutes run by Srinivas Thirupathi/Srinivas Tripathi (Samuthirakani). 

Abhi is one such student in that college whose parents don't have any hope on him that he would get a good seat in any prestigious engineering university. They decide to sell their ancestral property, a video shop which was run by Abhi's grandfather to pay for his graduation. Abhi's father asks him to go to the shop and vacate it. He goes to the shop with his friends and they start to clean it up. They find an old box full of tape records. They think of them as old pornographic films and rush to Abhi's home to watch them. When they play a cassette tape, they find a man teaching Mathematics in a very clean and efficient manner. The friends find the math taught by him very easy and check the box again. They find a receipt on which a name is written, A. S. Murthy and it dates back to 4th of May, 2000. They also notice the place written, Sozhavaram (Tamil) / Siripuram (Telugu). The trio decide to travel to that place to find the man named A. S. Murthy. After inquiring many people, they meet a Government college peon who tells them that A. S. Murthy isn't a lecturer but, was once a student and now the District Magistrate of Kadapa. The trio then leave for Kadapa to meet him. They meet him and ask him about the man who is in the video.    A. S. Murthy (Sumanth) tells them that the man in the video was his lecturer, Balamurugan 'Bala' sir (Tamil) / Bala Gangadhar Tilak 'Balu' sir (Telugu) (Dhanush). He narrates his story.

In the year 1993, during the time of privatization of the economy, education has become a necessity for people to grow big. Professional courses like MBBS & Engineering saw a huge demand. Noticing this sudden spike in education, many investors have turned education into business. In the name of quality education, they started cashing hefty money from parents to get their children admitted into their private colleges. At the same time, government had a hard time running their colleges and couldn't even pay the lecturers salaries. The private colleges even hired top class and experienced government college lecturers to teach in their own colleges. Many government colleges had to shut down due to shortage of lecturers. For the poor who couldn't afford the private institutions, education had become inaccessible. Srinivas Thirupathi/Srinivas Tripathi, the president of private junior colleges association hatches a master plan to adopt all the government junior colleges and send 3rd grade junior lecturers to those colleges, thus supporting the ruling government. Bala/Balu is one of those lecturers who is sent to a government junior college to teach Mathematics along with Karthik (Hyper Aadi), a Chemistry lecturer and Prakash Reddy (Tamil) / Bulli Reddy (Telugu) (Sha Ra), a Physics lecturer. Thirupathi/Tripathi promises that any lecturer who performs good in their field, will be promoted to senior lecturer upon being asked by Bala/Balu. The next day, the three lecturers are taken to Government Junior College, Sozhavaram (Tamil) / Government Junior College, Siripuram (Telugu). They are received warmly by the village's President, Muthu Pandian (Tamil) / Patthi Papa Rao (Telugu) (P. Sai Kumar). There, Bala/Balu sees Meenakshi (Samyuktha Menon), a Biology lecturer and falls for her. 

The next day, no student shows up to the college. Bala/Balu gets to know from the Telugu lecturer, Thanigachalam (Tamil) / Deekshitulu (Telugu) (Tanikella Bharani) that all the warm welcome was just for publicity and no student actually comes to the college. Meenakshi tells him that before the shut down of government colleges, this was the only government college in the district and many students from neighboring districts used to come here too. But now, they are unable to trust them even after opening thinking that they might close these government colleges  soon or later. Bala/Balu makes a promise to Meenakshi that he'll get all the students to the class within 3 days. He asks the president to organize a meeting with all the villagers and their children. He gives a speech on how necessary education is, making the children and parents realize it's importance. The students then start coming to the college. Bala/Balu also brings back an ex-student Muthu (Tamil) / Satti (Telugu) who discontinued his education after his parents death and got addicted to smoking & alcohol. He also reforms many students who aren't interested in studies. Meanwhile, Karthik gets ill and leaves the college and so does Prakash Reddy/Bulli Reddy. With their departure, Bala/Balu takes Physics & Chemistry classes as well, for MPC & BiPC students. He notices that the students from BiPC are ill-treated by the students from MPC due to caste differences. He eliminates this barrier within the class and from their minds by educating them in a proper manner. Meenakshi is impressed by this act and falls for him. 

The board exams happen and all the students pass in first class. With this 100% pass percentage achieved by Bala/Balu, Thirupathi/Tripathi confronts him angrily and tells him that the pass percentage of his own private college is just 75% and people are now wanting to join the government colleges. He tries to lure him with a senior lecturer position in a private college but Bala/Balu doesn't fall for it and in-fact, he stops working for him. He even challenges Thirupathi/Tripathi that he'll make all the students pass in distinction the next time and also get them a good rank in the EAMCET examination. With this, Thirupathi/Tripathi bribes the opposition party leader to create a strike on unemployment and also the ruling party's education minister to take back the positions offered to lecturers at Government junior colleges & recruit new ones. This causes Balu/Bala to lose his job and his father, Narayanan (Tamil) / Narayana (Telugu) (Aadukalam Naren) also loses his driver job. Nevertheless, Bala/Balu takes classes in an open field in the village. Thirupathi/Tripathi asks the President of the village to beat him up. Bala/Balu fights back but, the police take him into custody and give him 3rd degree treatment. He is thrown back into the village where the students get him into a bus safely and ask the driver to drop him off at his home. After he recovers, he takes up tuitions at his home after many failed job interviews at private junior colleges. Meenakshi arrives and makes it clear that she wants to stay with him only. They see a young boy willing to study but is unable to due to financial problems and his father's pressure to earn money. He takes him to his teacher's, Mohammed Ansari's (Hareesh Peradi) house who takes tuitions free of cost. 

Meenakshi asks Bala/Balu to return back to the village to teach the children. As he cannot, he gets a brilliant idea of recording videos of his lectures and send those cassette tapes to Bittu Bhupathi (Tamil) / Boothu Bhushanam (Telugu) (Rajendran) who runs a video shop and a theater. He asks Bhupathi/Bhushanam to run special shows for the intermediate students from 6PM to 9PM everyday where only Bala/Balu's lectures are played whereas the whole village should think of it as another movie. In this way, he takes classes for those students and also tells them that, they have to pass in distinction and also crack the EAMCET examination. To clear the students doubts, he visits the village in the form of drama artist every Sunday. Thirupathi/Tripathi gets to know about this and orders the President of the village to finish him off to which he doesn't agree stating that he just uses him. On the day of the EAMCET examination, while the students are on their way to the exam center, Thirupathi/Tripathi sends goons to stop them. Bala/Balu fights them off and sends them to give the exam. The students perform well and everyone clears the EAMCET examination in the top 46 ranks. Thirupathi/Tripathi offers money to all the 46 students, promises them sponsorship for their further studies and also good life to their families just for them to tell everyone that they have scored such good marks because of Thirupathi/Tripathi Educational Institutions and not because of Bala/Balu sir. Bala/Balu asks them to agree to it because that's what he always wanted, everyone to respect them. The students sign the contract. Bala/Balu sir is never seen after that.

Back in the present, A. S. Murthy is revealed to be none other than Muthu/Satti. He tells the trio that the theater where they studied is now turned into an EAMCET/IIT coaching center for the poor, developed by those 46 students who take turns and teach the students every year. When asked regarding the whereabouts of Bala/Balu sir, A. S. Murthy replies that he doesn't know where he is but he is sure that wherever he is present, he makes education accessible to everyone.

The epilogue shows Bala/Balu and Meenakshi running a school, Ansari School of Knowledge, named after his teacher, Mohammed Ansari in Ooty for the poor.

Cast 

 Dhanush as Balamurugan 'Bala' Sir (Tamil) / Bala Gangadhar Thilak 'Balu' Sir (Telugu), Mathematics teacher
 Samyuktha Menon as Meenakshi, Biology teacher
 P. Sai Kumar as President Muthu Pandian (Tamil) / Patthi Papa Rao (Telugu)
 Tanikella Bharani as Thanigachalam (Tamil) / Deekshitulu (Telugu), school headmaster and Telugu/Tamil & History teacher 
 Samuthirakani as Srinivas Thirupathi (Tamil) / Srinivas Tripathi (Telugu) 
 Thotapalli Madhu 
 Narra Srinivas as Sudarshan (Tamil) / Sudharshan Sharma (Telugu)
 Pammi Sai as peon at college 
 Hyper Aadi as Karthik, Chemistry teacher
 Sha Ra as Prakash Reddy (Tamil) / Bulli Reddy (Telugu), Physics teacher
 Aadukalam Naren as Narayanan (Tamil) / Narayana (Telugu), Bala's Father
 Ilavarasu as Education Minister 
 Rajendran as 'Bittu' Bhupathi (Tamil) / 'Boothu' Bhushanam (Telugu)
 Hareesh Peradi as Mohammed Ansari, Bala's teacher
 Praveena as Bala's mother
 Naga Mahesh as Inspector Suresh
 Bharathiraja as a Villager (cameo appearance)
 Sumanth as District collector Ananda Muthuvel Kumar IAS 'Muthu' (Tamil) / Annavaram Satyanarayana Murthy IAS "Sathi Gadu"(Telugu) (cameo appearance)
 Ken Karunas as Young Ananda Muthuvel Kumar 'Muthu' (Tamil) / Annavaram Satyanarayana Murthy "Sathi Gadu"(Telugu)

 Nitya Sri as Padmavati
 Rakhi as Veeranna

Production 
Principal photography of the film began on 7 January 2022. The second schedule of the shoot began in April 2022 when Dhanush had joined the sets after he had finished the shoot of Naane Varuvean. The filming was completed on October 2022.

Music

The music of the film is composed by G. V. Prakash Kumar. The first single titled  "Vaa Vaathi" in Tamil and "Mastaaru Mastaaru" in Telugu was released on 10 November 2022. The second single titled "Naadodi Mannan" in Tamil and "Banjara" in Telugu was released on 17 January 2023.

Release

Theatrical 
The film was scheduled for a theatrical release on 2 December 2022 in Tamil and Telugu, but was postponed. In November 2022, it was announced that the film will release on 17 February 2023. It was announced that Seven Screen Studio has acquired the distribution rights of the film in Tamil Nadu.

Home media 
Initially, there were reports suggesting that the film's digital rights were acquired by Aha, but later it was acquired by Netflix while the satellite rights were sold to Sun TV Network. The film premiered on Netflix on 17 March 2023 in Tamil, Telugu, and Hindi.

Reception 
Shubham Kulkarni of Koimoi rated the film 3.5 out of 5 stars and said "Vaathi is a film that at large has a big intention but it never forgets to entertain its audience". Logesh Balachandran of The Times of India rated the film 3 out of 5 stars and wrote "Vaathi is a film that's mounted on no-nonsense writing though it could have been even better". Latha Srinivasan of India Today rated the film 2.5 out of 5 and said that the film has a "noble mission" but Venky Atluri's story and narration are a big let-down. Avinash Ramachandran of The New Indian Express rated the  film 2.5 out of 5 stars and wrote "Despite using a 140-minute runtime to teach us a bunch of subjects, but the film teaches us are "Films don't have to be preachy to drive home a point" and "Dhanush can make anything look easy". Anandu Suresh of The Indian Express rated the film 1.5 out of 5 stars and termed the film as Dhanush starrer about right to education fares poorly. Bharathy Singaravel of The News Minute rated the film 1 out of 5 stars and wrote "A film of such mediocrity and confused politics".

References

External links 
 

Indian action drama films
2020s Telugu-language films
Indian multilingual films
Films about the education system in India
Films about examinations and testing
2020s Tamil-language films
Films about higher education
Films directed by Venky Atluri
Films about corruption in India
Films about mathematics
Films about teacher–student relationships
Films shot in Telangana
Films set in Andhra Pradesh
Films set in Tamil Nadu
2023 films
2023 action drama films